WNPT may refer to:

WNPT (TV), a television station (virtual channel 8) licensed to Nashville, Tennessee, United States
WFMA (FM), a radio station (102.9 FM) licensed to Marion, Alabama, United States, which held the call sign WNPT-FM from 1989 to 2018